Zentral- und Hochschulbibliothek Luzern (English: Lucerne Central and University Library), the largest library of Central Switzerland, is a cantonal library for the general and academic public in Lucerne.

External links 

Web site of the library
Main public catalog (iluplus)

Libraries in Switzerland
Buildings and structures in Lucerne
Cultural property of national significance in the canton of Lucerne